The Boco is a river in Portugal. It flows into the Ria de Aveiro at the Aveiro Lagoon through the Ílhavo Channel.

See also
List of rivers of Portugal

External links

References

Rivers of Portugal